The Third India-Africa Forum Summit (IAFS-III) was held in New Delhi, India from 26–30 October 2015. The five-day summit started with consultations on official level followed by the head of states/governments level summit on 29 October 2015 with scheduled bilateral meetings on 30 October 2015. This is going to be India's biggest diplomatic outreach involving delegates from a large number of African nations.

Background
The summit was earlier scheduled to be held in December 2014, with a three-year gap after the 2011 Adis Ababa summit. But Syed Akbaruddin, the official spokesperson of Indian Foreign Ministry, told the media that the scheduled summit was postponed to 2015 and would include a higher number of African leaders unlike the previous two summits where the event was restricted to only 10–15 African countries. Although media reports claimed that Ebola outbreak in Western African nations played key role behind the postponement of the summit.

Invitations were sent out to all 54 African nations through the respective Indian missions but it was not delivered only in Libya, as there is no government functioning at the time, and the Indian embassy also had to move to Tunisia. India's Foreign Minister Sushma Swaraj herself handed over the invitation to South African President Jacob Zuma during her visit to the African country in May 2015.

Logo
The logo depicts a lion with one half of an African lion and another half of an Indian lion. The official website mentioned about the logo: "Proud, Courageous, Bold and on the Prowl, ready to take on the future and seize every opportunity". In the background African map overlapping merges with Indian map in a reference to ancient Gondwanaland when Indian subcontinent used to be part of today's Africa's continental landmass millions of years ago. 
The India Gate, one of the iconic landmark of Delhi, the host city will be illuminated with 3D laser projection showing India-Africa shared heritage and India's contribution in African peace and prosperity, throughout the summit week.

Participants
The host country, India, had sent invitations to all 54 African head of state/government and trying to ensure maximum participation at the highest level. As of September 2015, the following dignitaries were expected to attend the summit in Delhi, India.

References

External links
 

Politics of Africa
2015 in India
Forum Summit, Africa-India
2015 in international relations
Diplomatic conferences in India
2015 in foreign relations of India